Jules is the French form of the Latin "Julius" (e.g. Jules César, the French name for Julius Caesar). It is the given name of:

People with the name
Jules Aarons (1921–2008), American space physicist and photographer
Jules Abadie (1876–1953), French politician and surgeon 
Jules Accorsi (born 1937), French football player and manager
Jules Adenis (1823–1900), French playwright and opera librettist
Jules Adler 1865–1952), French painter
Jules Asner (born 1968), American television personality
Jules Aimé Battandier (1848–1922), French botanist
Jules Bernard (born 2000), American basketball player
Jules Bianchi (1989–2015), French Formula One driver
Jules Breton (1827–1906), French  Realist painter
Jules-André Brillant (1888–1973), Canadian entrepreneur
Jules Brunet (1838–1911), French Army general
Jules Charles-Roux (1841–1918), French businessman and politician
Jules Dewaquez (1899–1971), French footballer
Jules Marie Alphonse Jacques de Dixmude (1858–1928), Belgian Army general
Jules Armand Dufaure (1798–1881), French statesman
Jules Engel, American filmmaker, painter, sculptor, graphic artist, set designer, animator, film director and teacher
Jules Feiffer (born 1929), American cartoonist
Jules Gervais-Courtellemont (1863–1931), French war photographer from World War I
Jules Greenbaum (1867-1924), German film producer
Jules Jordan (1850-1927), American composer, operatic tenor, vocal instructor and conductor
Jules Jordan (born 1972), American pornographic actor, director and producer
Jules "Skip" Kendall (born 1964), American professional golfer
Jules Gilmer Korner Jr. (1888–1967), judge of the United States Board of Tax Appeals
Jules Maenen (1932–2007), Dutch road bicycle and track cyclist
Jules Massenet (1842–1912), French composer
Jules Michelet (1798–1874), French historian
Jules Monge (1855–1934), French painter
Jules Auguste Muraire (1883-1946), French Actor
Jules Achille Noël (1815–1881), French landscape and maritime painter
Jules Pastré (1809–1899), French banker, businessman and equestrian active in Egypt.
Jules Rimet (1878–1956), French football administrator and former FIFA president
Jules Védrines (1881–1919), French aviator
Jules Verne (1828–1905), French author
Jules Wright (1948-2015), Australian-English theatre director
Jules Wright (politician) (1933-2022), American politician and businessman

Fictional characters
Jules Cobb, the main character of the US television series Cougar Town
Jules Winnfield, a fictional character in the film Pulp Fiction
 Jules Vaughn, one of the main characters in the US television series Euphoria
 Jules, a fictional character featured in the video game The Legend of Zelda: Breath of the Wild. In this case, the use of the name Jules is assigned to a young woman.
 Jules Tournier, the twelve-year-old twin brother of Julie, and one of the two titular characters of the 1990s animated show- The Twins of Destiny
 Jules, a fictional character in the graphic novel On a Sunbeam by Tillie Walden
 Jules Van Patten, a fictional character from the film St. Elmo's Fire
 Jules Verne Durand, a linguist aboard the Daban Urnud in Anathem by Neal Stephenson

Other 

 Jules (film) is an upcoming feature film starring Ben Kingsley and Jane Curtin.

See also
Jools
Julian (disambiguation)
Julien (disambiguation)
Julius (disambiguation)

French masculine given names